Alexander Bozheryanov (1825– ) was an Imperial Russian regiment, brigade and division commander. He fought in the war against the Ottoman Empire. He was a recipient of the Order of Saint Anna.

Sources
 Старчевский, А.А. Памятник Восточной войны 1877-1878 гг., заключающий в себе в алфавитном порядке биографические очерки всех отличившихся, убитых, раненых и контуженных: генералов, штаб и обер-офицеров, докторов, санитаров, сестер милосердия и отличившихся рядовых стр 29

External links
 Русская  Императорская  армия

1825 births
Year of death missing
People from Novgorod Governorate
Russian untitled nobility
Russian military personnel of the Russo-Turkish War (1877–1878)
Recipients of the Order of St. Anna, 1st class